The Rashtriya Janata Dal ( RJD; translation: National People's Party) is an Indian political party, based in the states of Bihar, Jharkhand. The party was founded in 1997 by Lalu Prasad Yadav.

The party's support base has traditionally been Other Backward Classes, Dalits and Muslims and it is considered a political champion of the lower castes. In 2008, RJD received the status of recognized national level party following its performance in north-eastern states. RJD was derecognised as a national party on 30 July 2010. Leading the Mahagathbandhan government with over 165 MLAs, it is currently the single largest political party in Bihar and currently the ruling party in Bihar, with the party's youth leader Tejashwi Yadav as Deputy Chief Minister. RJD is also part of Ruling Government in Jharkhand and Kerala with its allies Mahagathbandhan (Jharkhand).

History

Formation

On 5 July 1997, Lalu Prasad Yadav, Raghuvansh Prasad Singh, Mohammad Shahabuddin, Abdul Bari Siddiqui, Kanti Singh, Mohammed Taslimuddin along with seventeen Lok Sabha MPs and eight Rajya Sabha MPs along with supporters gathered at New Delhi formed the new political party, Rashtriya Janata Dal. It was formed as breakaway of Janata Dal. Lalu Prasad was elected as the first president of RJD. It is a centre-left party.

In the March 1998 national elections, RJD won 17 Lok Sabha seats from Bihar but failed to make significant headway in any other state. Later that year, the party formed an alliance with Mulayam Singh Yadav's Samajwadi Party as an anti-Bharatiya Janata Party secular coalition but the coalition failed in garnering any widespread support.

In UPA

In the October 1999 elections, RJD fought the election in alliance with Indian National Congress but lost 10 Lok Sabha seats including the seat of Lalu Prasad Yadav.

In the 2000 state elections, however, it performed well, winning a majority of the seats in the state assembly in Bihar. Continuing its upswing in electoral fortunes, the party won 24 Lok Sabha seats in the 2004 elections that it fought in alliance with Indian National Congress. It was a part of Indian National Congress led United Progressive Alliance (UPA) from 2004 to May 2009, wherein Lalu Yadav held the position of the Minister of Railways.

In February 2005 Bihar Legislative Assembly election RJD won only 75 seats and lost the power. In the state elections held later that year – as a result of no party being able to form a government and RJD continued its downward slide winning only 54 seats.

In 2009 Indian general election, the RJD broke its alliance from UPA when seat sharing talks failed. RJD formed its alliance with Ram Vilas Paswan's Lok Janshakti Party and Mulayam Singh Yadav's Samajwadi Party what the media has dubbed the "Fourth Front". RJD performed poorly and won just four seats, all of them in Bihar. However, in 2010 Assembly election, the RJD did not continue their alliance with Samajwadi Party.

In 2014 Indian general election RJD came back to UPA and contested election in alliance with Indian National Congress and Nationalist Congress Party in Bihar. Out of 40 seats in Bihar, RJD will contest on 27 seats, INC on 12 and NCP on one. RJD won only four out of total forty Loksabha seats in Bihar.

Organisation
The party leadership consists of the following bodies.

National President
Lalu Prasad Yadav is the National President of RJD.

National Vice President
The national vice president members of the party Mangani Lal Mandal, Mohd Ilyas Hussain, Ahmed Ashfaq Karim, Rabri Devi, Raghuvansh Prasad Singh and Shivanand Tiwary.

National Secretary general :  Abdul Bari Siddiqui.

National Treasurer  : Sunil Kumar Singh

Political Affairs Committee

National Executive Committee 
The national executive members of the party Lalu Prasad Yadav, Tejashwi Yadav, Tej Pratap Yadav, Misa Bharti, Prem Chandra Gupta, Manoj Jha, Abdul Bari Siddiqui and Ram Chandra Purve.

The Mahagathbandhan (Grand Alliance)

On 14 April 2015, the RJD, Janata Dal (United), Janata Dal (Secular), the Indian National Lok Dal, Samajwadi Party, and Samajwadi Janata Party (Rashtriya) announced that they would merge into a new national Janata Parivar alliance in order to oppose the BJP, thus breaking their long time alliance with the INC. This would give the alliance 14 Lok Sabha seats and 30 Rajya Sabha seats.

On 7 May 2015, the RJD expelled Rajesh Ranjan for six years due to anti-RJD activities after speculation rose that he may join the Biju Janata Dal for the 2015 Bihar Legislative Assembly election but he formed a new party called Jan Adhikar Party.

In November 2015, RJD won the elections as party became the single largest party with 80 followed by Janata Dal (United) with 71 seats, BJP with 53 seats and Congress with 27 seats. In terms of vote share, BJP came first with 24.4%, followed by RJD with 18.4% and JD (U) with 16.8% and Congress got 6.7%. Janata Dal (United)'s Nitish Kumar became the Chief Minister and Lalu's son Tejashwi Yadav became the Deputy Chief Minister of Bihar.

In July 2017, following the corruption cases against Tejashwi Yadav, Nitish Kumar asked Yadav to resign from the cabinet, which was refused by RJD. In order to protect his clean image towards corruption, Nitish Kumar resigned on 26 July 2017, ending RJD's stake in Bihar government. What followed next was a coalition BJP and JDU as a result Nitish Kumar became the Chief Minister again whereas Sushil Modi, a prominent BJP leader became the Deputy Chief Minister.

Alliance between Indian National Congress and the RJD has factioned in October 2021. When Tejashwi given tickets to candidates in Bihar By-elections, where Congress was fixed to stand candidates.

In August 2022, the Mahagathbandhan, Janata Dal (United), Indian National Congress, Hindustan Awam Morcha and Left Front joined again to form 2/3th Majority government in Bihar Legislative Assembly.

Electoral performance

Lok Sabha elections

Bihar Vidhan Sabha (Lower House) Election

Jharkhand Vidhan Sabha Election

List of Chief Ministers

Chief Ministers

Deputy Chief Ministers

List of Central Ministers

Prominent members
Raghuvansh Prasad Singh, close aide of Lalu Prasad Yadav, RJD Co-founder and Union Minister for Rural Development.
Raghunath Jha, close aide of Lalu Prasad Yadav, RJD Co-founder and Union Minister. Responsible for start of Lalu Raj in Bihar.
Abdul Bari Siddiqui, close associate of Lalu Prasad Yadav former Leader of Leader of Opposition following the 2010 Bihar Legislative Assembly election until the split between JD(U) and BJP and former Finance Minister Govt. of Bihar. Former Bihar RJD President.
Alok Kumar Mehta, National General Secretary of Rashtriya Janata Dal.
Mohammad Shahabuddin He is a former Member of Parliament from the Siwan constituency in the state of Bihar, former National Vice President and a former member of the National Executive Committee of the RJD.
Prem Kumar Mani, Vice President and Strategist of RJD.
Jagada Nand Singh, State President of RJD for Bihar.
 Dr Tanweer Hassan, Senior Vice President RJD Bihar, Former Member Bihar Legislative Council.
Shivchandra Ram, former Member of legislative Assembly.
Ram Chandra Purve is a member of the Bihar Legislative Council. Former state president of RJD.
Jay Prakash Narayan Yadav General Secretary, RJD. Former Cabinet Minister Bihar Govt. Former Union Minister, MP.
Sarfaraz Alam Former Minister Bihar Govt. Former MP Araria.
Manoj Jha MP Rajya Sabha and National Spokesperson of RJD.
Prem Chand Gupta MP Rajya Sabha and former cabinet minister in Ministry of Company Affairs of India in First Manmohan Singh ministry.
Ahmad Ashfaque Karim MP Rajya Sabha.
Surendra Prasad Yadav senior RJD leader and Member of Bihar Legislative Assembly from Belaganj.Chairman of the Public Accounts Committee.

See also 

Tejashwi Yadav
Lalu Prasad Yadav

References

External links 

 

 
Political parties in India
Political parties established in 1997
1997 establishments in Bihar
Janata Parivar
Janata Dal
State political parties in Bihar